Corubia is a monotypic moth genus of the family Erebidae. Its only species, Corubia testacea, is found in Brazil. Both the genus and the species were first described by Schaus in 1906.

References

Calpinae
Monotypic moth genera